The 1921–22 Sheffield Shield season was the 26th season of the Sheffield Shield, the domestic first-class cricket competition of Australia. Victoria won the championship.

Table

Statistics

Most Runs
Jack Ryder 484

Most Wickets
Ted McDonald 25

References

External links
 Season at ESPN Cricinfo

Sheffield Shield
Sheffield Shield
Sheffield Shield seasons